Nune Siravyan, is an Armenian artist, theatre expert, born on July 5, 1973 in the city of Yerevan, in the family of the Honored Artist of Armenia Henrik Siravyan.

Career 
In 1994 Nune graduated from the Yerevan's State Fine Arts and Theatre Institute the faculty of theatre expert (theatre critic).
Nune Siravyan creates costume sketches, photo frames, collages, handmade jewelry, dolls, accessories made of glass and stone items.

Nune has done illustrations for children's magazine "Tsitsernak" (Swallow).

Exhibitions 
Nune has solo exhibitions in
2007 National Aesthetic Center, Yerevan, Armenia
2011 "Studio" art café, Yerevan Armenia
2016  "Author's dolls", Yerevan History Museum
Nune Siravyan's works has been exhibited in "Black Maria" gallery, Glendale, "Papillon" art institute, Los Angeles.

Nune Siravyan has Exhibited with these artists:
Jayson Atienza 			
Paul "AnimalChan" Chan 	
Barron Claiborne 			
Miss Numa Perrier 	
Numa Perrier 			
Terence Rosemore 	
Sam Saghatelyan 			
Bertrell Smith 	
James Stephen Terrell

Quotes from Nune Siravyan 
I love colors too much. I do not hesitate to synthesize them. I do not have a favorite color. There are no bad colors, we can combine the nuances.

In my collages I use paper, cloth materials which come to replace paint. Unlike paint they make my works more interesting and (in a good sense) complex. By their colors and forms they help me to build my fantasy world and they give an unexpected turn while working.

See also
List of Armenian artists
List of Armenians
Culture of Armenia

References

External links
 Nune Siravyan
Artslant Worldwide Nune Siravyan

1973 births
Armenian painters
Living people
Artists from Yerevan
Armenian women painters